Air France Flight 009 was a scheduled international flight that crashed into a mountain while attempting to land at Santa Maria Airport, Azores on a stopover during a scheduled international passenger flight from Paris-Orly Airport to New York City. All 48 people on board were killed.

Aircraft
The aircraft involved was a Lockheed L-749A-79-46 Constellation F-BAZN, msn 2546, built in 1947.

Accident
The aircraft was operating a scheduled international passenger flight from Paris-Orly Airport, France to New York City, with a stopover at Santa Maria Airport, Azores. There were 11 crew and 37 passengers on board. The flight departed from Orly at 20:05 on 27 October.

After no further communications were received from the aircraft, a search was initiated, involving eight aircraft and several ships. The aircraft was found to have crashed into Pico Redondo on São Miguel Island,  (It is sometimes incorrectly said to have crashed on Pico da Vara) due north of the airport. All 48 on board were killed in the crash and subsequent fire. The bodies of the victims were recovered and initially taken to the church in Algarvia before they were repatriated. At the time, the accident was the deadliest to have occurred in Portugal and also the deadliest involving the Lockheed Constellation.

Investigation
The accident was investigated by the Bureau d'Enquêtes et d'Analyses pour la Sécurité de l'Aviation Civile. The investigation found that the cause of the accident was controlled flight into terrain due to inadequate navigation by the pilot whilst operating under VFR conditions. It was found that the pilot had sent inaccurate position reports and that he had failed to identify the airport.

Notable casualties
Notable people killed in the accident included the French former middleweight world champion boxer Marcel Cerdan; French violinist Ginette Neveu, French artist Bernard Boutet de Monvel and Kay Kamen, a merchandising executive for the Walt Disney Company.

Notes
Times quoted in this article are local time, per sources used. Paris times are thus Central European Time (CET). Azores times are Greenwich Mean Time, which is one hour behind CET.

References

Aviation accidents and incidents in 1949
Aviation accidents and incidents in Portugal
009
Accidents and incidents involving the Lockheed Constellation
1949 in Portugal
Transport in the Azores
São Miguel Island
October 1949 events in Europe
1949 disasters in Portugal